Ateya Ahmed El-Belqasi (born January 22, 1984) is an Egyptian footballer. He currently plays as a defender for the Egyptian Premier League club El-Ittihad.

Career
El-Belqasi joined El Ahly in an £E800,000 transfer from El-Olympi in 2009. 
He had previously played for Ghazl Domiat and Baladeyet El-Mehalla.

After a brief spell at Libyan Premier League club Ahly Benghazi on loan, El-Belqasy left the club, saying he felt he would "not benefit from playing in the Libyan Premier League due to its poor standard of players and the poor state of the stadia." He also said that he felt that players in the Egyptian Third Division were better than those in the Libyan Premier League.

References

1984 births
Living people
Egyptian footballers
Expatriate footballers in Libya
Egyptian expatriates in Libya
Sportspeople from Alexandria
Al-Ahly SC (Benghazi) players
Association football central defenders
Libyan Premier League players